Euseius kalimpongensis is a species of mite in the family Phytoseiidae.

References

kalimpongensis
Articles created by Qbugbot
Animals described in 1969